House of Bones is a 2010 sci-fi horror film. The film was written by Anthony C. Ferrante and Jay Frasco, and it was directed by Jeffery Scott Lando. It stars Corin Nemec and Charisma Carpenter. The film was released on DVD January 25, 2011.

Plot
Psychic Heather Burton (Carpenter) and a team of TV ghost hunters travel to investigate a haunted house. Upon their arrival, they find a foreboding house with a mind of its own, and as darkness falls, the house begins to kill the crew one by one.

Cast
 Charisma Carpenter as Heather Burton - a psychic
 Corin Nemec as Quentin French - the show host
 Marcus Lyle Brown as Greg Fisher - a lead investigator
 Colin Galyean as Simon - the other lead investigator
 Ricky Wayne, Jr as Tom Rule - the producer
 Kyle Russell Clements as Bub - the production assistant
 Stephanie Honoré as Sara Minor - the realtor

Reception
The film was met with mixed reviews. Dread Central gave the film a negative review, however commented that the cast performed well despite the weak script.

References

External links
 

2010 television films
2010 films
American television films
2010s English-language films
Films directed by Jeffery Scott Lando